The electric vehicle industry in India is a growing industry. The central and state governments have launched schemes and incentives to promote electric mobility in the country and some regulations and standards are also in place. While the country stands to benefit in a large way by switching its transport from IC engines to electric motor-powered, there are challenges like lack of charging infrastructure, high initial cost and lack of electricity produced from renewable energy. Still, e-commerce companies, car manufacturers, app-based transportation network companies and mobility solution providers have entered the sector and are slowly building up electric car capacity and visibility.

Standards

Charging 

Indian Standard 17017 (IS 17017) is the governing standard in India, having multiple parts and sections largely compatible with IEC 61851 and IEC 62196:
 Part 1 provides basic features and general requirements
 Part 2 provides connector standards
 Part 2 § 1 is adapted from IEC 62196-1
 Part 2 § 2 is adapted from IEC 62196-2, made specific to India
 Part 2 § 3 is adapted from IEC 62196-3
 Part 3 is adapted from IEC 61851-3 for light EVs
 Part 21 is adapted from IEC 61851-21 and provides electromagnetic compatibility standards for charging units (on-board and off-board)
 Part 23 is adapted from IEC 61851-23 and provides requirements for DC EVSE
 Part 24 is adapted from IEC 61851-24 and provides communication requirements for DC EVSE

Charging stations in India are classified as Distributed or High Power, depending on the maximum power that can be supplied. Within these two classifications are distinctions based on the current supplied (alternating or direct current) and intended use:

AC charging
IS:17017 specifies Bharat EV Charging standard AC001 for Level 1. It uses 15 A, 230 V, 3.3 kW, and an IEC 60309 connector. Electric vehicles can be charged using a regular 220V – 15 A household supply that delivers around 2.5 kW power. There is no policy or standard defined for at-home EV charging. Bharat EV specifications recommend the installation of a Residual Current Circuit Breaker to ensure safety and using an IEC 60309 Industrial connector, but a 3 pin 15 A plug could also be used. For higher power AC charging (Levels 2 and 3, ~22 kW), Type 2 connectors are specified. The advantage of Type 2 connectors is that, they can use three phase AC power for charging.

DC charging
The public DC Charging Standard is DC 001 for Level 1. It uses custom GB/T for EV-EVSE communication over CAN mode. It uses 200 A, 15 kW, and a GB/T 20234.3 connector. Maximum DC O/P Voltage is 100 VDC. There are very few cars in market with this standards like Mahindra e-Varito, Mahindra e20 and Tata Moters e-Tigor.

The IS:17017-1 published by BIS in August, 2018 recommends CCS-2 (Combined Charging System Combo 2) and CHAdeMO protocols for high power Level 4 fast charging. The advantage of CCS over CHAdeMO and GB/T is that it uses Power Line Carrier Communications (PLCC) for EV-EVSE communication while CHAdeMO and GB/T use CAN. PLC allows secure communication using encrypted messages and the link can support higher data-rate as compared to that by CAN.

Electric Vehicle Supply Equipment (EVSE)
The IS:17017 standard published by the Bureau of Indian Standards (BIS) covers general requirements and safety norms for EVSEs.

Central Management System (CMS)
The Open Charge Point Protocol (OCPP) 1.5 or higher over the internet is to be used.

Charging stations

The Government of India has declared public charging stations and EV charging businesses as a de-licensed activity. The government has laid down that there should be at least one charging station in a grid of 3 km x 3 km in cities and one station every 25 km on both sides of highways. This coverage is to be achieved in cities with a population of more than 4 million and all existing expressways and important highways connected to these mega cities by 2022. The second phase (3 to 5 years) will cover big cities like state capitals and UT headquarters.  There have been initiatives to set up community charging stations, as in the case of Plugin India facilitated charging stations. News reports have indicated about plans to provide solar-powered charging points at the existing fuel stations of the country. There are companies like Tata Power, Fortum and others which are engaged in the business of electric vehicle charging. They have already installed all varieties of chargers – rapid DC chargers and level 2 AC chargers for all kinds of applications – public access, workplace charging, fleet charging, residential communities, malls, highways etc. and have large plans to scale up.

Charging infrastructure, mainly setting up of level 2 charging at public level shall be the toughest challenge in terms of service integration for India. For normal charging, the charging time poses a serious problem as it ranges from 6 to 8 hours whereas for fast DC charging; cost & high renewable energy are the biggest factors which could pose a problem. It is also assumed that 10% of the charging infrastructure required in India shall be composed of fast charging station and rest 90% shall come from level 2 public charging setups. On 22 May 2018 Ather Energy launched its charging infrastructure service in Bangalore called Ather Grid, with each charging station called 'Point'. The service is open to all electric vehicles but has been deployed where Ather plans to launch its own electric scooter.

Government policies

Union

Reiterating its commitment to the Paris Agreement, the Government of India has plans to make a major shift to electric vehicles by 2030. The Government released a two-pronged strategy aimed at both buyers and manufacturers, in which it offers $1.4 billion in subsidies to buyers, while imposing a hike on import tariffs to increase manufacturing of these vehicles by domestic companies. The Government is mainly focusing to electrify public transportation as the subsidies, mainly available for two-wheelers, three-wheelers, and buses. This policy also earmarks $140 million to develop charging infrastructure which should further help the development of the EV industry in India. On 14 December 2018, the government also released a document which outlines the standard and guidelines for EV Charging infrastructure. Beyond the specifications of the charging infrastructure, the guidelines also required a charging station to be present every 25 km along a road/highway.

Energy Efficiency Services Limited (EESL) is procuring 10,000 number of Electric Vehicles from reputed manufacturers for distribution to Government Departments on rental model and upfront sale model. EESL's tender of 10,000 number of EV's has reduced the cost of EV's substantially.

National Electric Mobility Mission Plan, 2020 (NEMMP)
The National Electric Mobility Mission Plan, 2020 was launched by the Government of India in year 2012 with the aim of improving the national fuel security through the promotion of hybrid and electric vehicles. Auto industry contributes 22% to the manufacturing GDP. From the help of new Manufacturing Policy, contribution of manufacturing in overall economy will increase to 25% by year 2022. The National Electric Mobility Mission Plan targets 30% of EV penetration in India by 2030.

Faster Adoption and Manufacturing of Hybrid and Electric vehicles (FAME)
The Government started Faster Adoption and Manufacturing of Hybrid and Electric vehicles (FAME) scheme which provides incentives for purchasing electric vehicles. Phase I of the scheme lasted from 2015 to 2019, while Phase II began in 2019 and is planned to be completed in 2022.

Government is releasing tenders to increase charging infrastructure in the country. The scheme offers incentives to the electric and hybrid vehicles ranging from Rs.1,800 to Rs.29,000 for scooters and motorcycles and Rs.1.38 Lac for cars. FAME is a part of National Electric Mobility Mission Plan by Government of India.

Go Electric campaign 
The government launched the Go Electric campaign in the start of 2021 to encourage the adoption of electric mobility vehicles and electric cooking appliances and to ensure energy security in the country. Road Transport and Highways Minister Nitin Gadkari launched the campaign, saying Go Electric is a future for India that will promote low-cost, environmentally friendly and indigenous electrical products. He expressed concern about the huge cost of importing fossil fuels and said  emissions from transportation vehicles are a major challenge. The country must encourage the use of vehicles that run on alternative fuels such as electric batteries, CNG and biofuels.

The Government to suspend the registration fee for EVs will persuade states also to give tax breaks

Delhi
In 2019 the Delhi Government approved 1,000 low floor AC Electric buses to be used in Delhi's public transport system. The buses have CCTV, Automatic Vehicle Tracking System (AVTS), panic buttons and panic alarms. The subsidy given by government is up to Rs 75 lakh or 60% of cost of bus, whichever is lesser. As of Aug 24, 2022, Delhi had 249 electric buses plying on the roads. Delhi based startup Park+ will set up 10000 chargers by 2024 in Delhi NCR

Tamil Nadu
Tamil Nadu chief minister Edappadi K Palaniswami launched Mauto Electric mobility's electric autorickshaws – touted as India's first retrofit electric autos in India in 2019.

Dubai-based KMC group and Mauto Electric Mobility will convert petrol-run autorickshaws into electric vehicles with an investment of Rs 100 crore and offer job opportunities to 5,000 people. KMC group and Mauto Electric Mobility signed a MOU during chief minister's stopover in Dubai during his three-nation trip in September. The MoUs were signed at an event hosted by the Business Leaders Forum (BLF), an initiative of UAE's ministry of economy and the Indian Embassy in the UAE. The state government recently gave necessary clearances for the units to start the venture.

“The driving range per full charge of three hours will be 100 km. The aim is to introduce 4,000 electric rickshaws in the city, 100 by a month to reduce air pollution to a large extent. The autos are fitted with CCTV surveillance, panic button and television. It is highly safe for children going to school and women,” said Mansoor Ali Khan, chairman, Mauto group of companies. Mansoor, chief executive officer of MAuto Group, said the petrol-driven autorickshaws would incur an expenditure of Rs 350 – Rs 400 for every 100 km, while it is Rs 40 for electric autorickshaws.“ The retrofitting of autorickshaws will cost only Rs 1.2 to Rs 1.5 lakh. We are ready to convert the vehicles registered after 2000,” he added. The company is planning to set up charging stations in each of the ten zones of the city. Charging on the go will be possible with the help of a mobile app.

Karnataka
Karnataka approved Electric Vehicle and Energy Storage Policy 2017. It aim to attract investment of Rs 31,000 crore and create around 55,000 employment. The union government has unveiled its vision to make country all-electric vehicle market by year 2031 to reduce dependency on fossil fuels and reduce its carbon footprint.

Maharashtra
The Maharashtra Government is focusing on increasing EV use in the state by proposing to exempt EV's from road tax and providing a 15% subsidy to the first lakh EV's registered in the state. To improve suitable infrastructure, the government proposed to provide a maximum subsidy of Rs 1 million (~$15,549) per charging station up to first 250 charging stations that are set up in Maharashtra.

Uttarakhand
In 2018, the Uttarakhand Government introduced a new scheme to help the manufacturing and promote the use of EV's as well. The scheme would provide companies with loans ranging between Rs 10 crore and Rs 50 crore to build EV's and charging infrastructure. The scheme also doesn't charge motor tax for the first lakh customers of EV's for five years.

Gujarat 
Gujarat government is committed to reducing its carbon footprint by 6 lakh tons per year by bringing down pollution occurring due to use of conventional fossil fuel. A large number of buyers are resorting to EVs by availing subsidies up to Rs 20,000 for two-wheelers, Rs 50,000 for three-wheelers, and Rs 1.5 lakh for four-wheelers. Up to 10 capital infrastructure is being offered to set up charging stations in the state under the policy. Already 280 such charging stations have been set up across Gujarat after the announcement of EV policy and 250 more are in pipeline.

Advantages

 Electric vehicles are around 3–5 times more efficient than internal combustion vehicles in utilising energy. Even if electric vehicles run on electricity produced from fossil fuels, the overall efficiency of electric vehicles is still higher and the pollution is less, because large thermal power plants are much more efficient than IC engines, and it is easier to control emissions from power plants than vehicle engines.
 Electric vehicles save energy by regenerative braking. Around 30%–70% of the energy used for propulsion can be recovered, with higher percentages applicable to stop-and-go city driving.
 Air quality indices related to India indicate that the air in many cities of India is no longer healthy. Automobile related pollution has been one of the causes for this.
 Aspects related to global warming needs a shift to automobile solutions that reduce / do not produce greenhouse gas emissions. If electric vehicles run on electricity produced from non-polluting sources of energy like hydro, solar, wind, tidal and nuclear, they reduce emissions due to vehicles almost to zero.
 The need to reduce dependency on a fossil-fuel based economy. India's crude oil imports for 2014–15 was 112 billion dollars (approximately 7,00,000 crore rupees). For comparison, the allocation for the Mahatma Gandhi National Rural Employment Guarantee Scheme, in budget 2017–18, is 48,000 crore rupees.
 India can become a global provider for clean mobility solutions and processes that are affordable and scalable.
 People living in some Indian cities are being affected by noise pollution. Some of the Indian cities have the worst noise pollution levels in the world. Electric vehicles are much quieter and may contribute to a reduction in noise pollution levels in the cities.
 Energy efficiency and emission reduction has improved in automobiles. Yet, the growth in total number of vehicles on road, and the resulting total pollution and total energy consumption removed all gains made by betterment in energy efficiency and emission reduction by automobiles. Energy efficiency measures and pollution control measures did not keep pace with the sales growth in vehicles. The total number of vehicles registered in India has been 5.4 million, 11 million, 33 million, 40 million and 210 million in the years 1981, 1986, 1996, 2000 and 2015. This indicates 39 times percentage growth in the total number of vehicles between 1981 and 2015. The total number of vehicles sold in India increased between 1,54,81,381 in 2010–11 and 2,04,69,385 in 2015–16 indicating a 30+ percentage growth in this five-year period.
 Through smart charging, electric vehicles can help to balance the balance-supply variations in the electricity grid, and provide a buffer against electricity supply failures.
Electric vehicles have much fewer moving parts as compared to vehicles with IC engines. Thus, being simpler, they are cheaper and easier to maintain.
Electric motors can deliver high torque at low speeds. As a result, electric vehicles deliver much better performance while starting off and on slopes than IC engine-powered vehicles.

Disadvantages

The cost of EVs is very high mainly due to the cost of Li-ion cells. The battery packs are imported and cost a lot, about $275/KWh in India. This combined with the GST of 18% and the lack of lithium in India, further increase the cost of batteries.
The charging infrastructure for electric vehicles in India has not been fully developed yet. 
In India electricity is mainly produced by burning coal, which produces a great amount of greenhouse emissions. With the introduction of EVs and charging infrastructure, the electricity demand will go up a lot and the whole point of introducing EVs to reduce GHG emissions would be ineffective, if all this electricity was produced by burning coal. Moreover, India's Distribution companies hold debts and are unable to suffice the energy requirement of the whole country adequately. If EVs were to enter this equation, the sudden increase in electricity requirement would put extra load on these companies. Moreover, there are a lot of factors that would go into deciding pricing of the electricity as well the demand on the grid.

See also

 Automotive industry in India
 Energy efficiency in transport
 List of prototype solar-powered cars
 List of vehicle plants in India
 Solar car
 Solar vehicle
 Vehicular metrics
 Oil and gas industry in India

References

 
India
Road transport in India
Electric power in India
Automotive industry in India